The University of Bolton Stadium is the home ground of Bolton Wanderers F.C. in Horwich, Greater Manchester, England.

Opening in 1997, it was named the Reebok Stadium, after club sponsors Reebok. In 2014, Bolton Wanderers signed a naming rights deal with Italian  sportswear company Macron. It was renamed the University of Bolton Stadium in 2018. From 1 July 2023 it will be known as the Toughsheet Community Stadium. In UEFA matches, it is called Bolton Wanderers Stadium due to UEFA regulations on sponsorship.

A hotel forms part of the stadium and some of the rooms offer views of the pitch.

History
University of Bolton Stadium is an  all-seater stadium with a capacity of almost 29,000 and was completed in 1997, replacing the club's old ground, Burnden Park.

Burnden Park, which at its peak had held up to 60,000 spectators, was becoming increasingly dilapidated by the 1980s, and a section of terracing was sold off for redevelopment as a supermarket to help pay off the club's rising debts. Bolton Wanderers had dropped into the Third Division in 1983 and later spent a season in the Fourth Division. In January 1990, the Taylor Report required all clubs in the first and second tiers of the English league to have an all-seater stadium by the 1994-95 season. Bolton were still in the Third Division at this stage, but were aiming for promotion - which was finally achieved in 1993. By this stage, the club's owners had decided to relocate to a new all-seater stadium away from Burnden Park, and by 1995 had identified a location at Horwich as the preferred site of a new stadium.

The lead consultant/architect of the project was Lobb Sports, while local firm Bradshaw Gass & Hope acted as planning supervisors and quantity surveyors, the contractor was Birse Construction, and Deakin Callard & Partners provided structural engineering services. The value of the contract was £25 million (US$42.1 million). The stadium is noted for its distinct gabled architecture, first pioneered by the John Smith's Stadium.

The stadium was opened in 1997 by John Prescott, a Labour Party politician who was the Deputy Prime Minister of the United Kingdom at the time.

The stadium consists of four stands: The Carrs Pasties (North) Stand at one end; the South Stand (Franking Sense and also the away end) at the other end; the West Stand  at one side of the pitch; and the Nat Lofthouse (east) Stand at the other side.

When the stadium was named after long-time team sponsor Reebok in 1997, fans considered the title impersonal and believed that too much emphasis was being placed on financial considerations. This opposition considerably lessened after the stadium was built, as fans grew accustomed to the name and were bolstered by Reebok's status as a local company.

The Macron title was applied in July 2014 after the Bolton Wanderers club finalised a partnership with the large Italian sportswear brand. In April 2014, long-serving club chairman Phil Gartside stated that he was "proud" to be associated with Macron and had "been very impressed with their [Macron's] passion for football". A four-year duration was negotiated for the Macron deal and the club had the option to extend at completion.

When the deal with Macron came to an end in August 2018 the stadium was again renamed, this time as the University of Bolton Stadium.

Footballing firsts

 The first competitive – and Premier League – match at the stadium was a 0–0 draw between Bolton and Everton on Monday 1 September 1997. Bolton's Gerry Taggart had a header that crossed the line wrongly ruled out, and the points it would have won would have saved Bolton from relegation at Everton's expense.
 The first player to score at the stadium was Alan Thompson, a penalty in the 1–1 draw against Tottenham Hotspur, on 23 September. Chris Armstrong, who later in his career had a short spell with Wanderers, got the equaliser.
 On 6 September 2002, it hosted its first international, a friendly between England under-21 and Yugoslavia under-21. It ended in a 1–1 draw with 10,531 in attendance. Visitor Danko Lazović scored the first goal and Shaun Wright-Phillips equalised.
 Lokomotiv Plovdiv were the visitors in the first UEFA Cup match at the stadium, on 15 September 2005. Boban Janchevski scored first for the visitors, but late goals from El Hadji Diouf and Jared Borgetti secured a 2–1 home victory in the first competitive European match in Bolton's history.

Other events

The stadium has hosted concerts by Oasis, Pink, Elton John, Coldplay, The Killers, Little Mix and Rod Stewart. The music video for Coldplay’s 2005 single Fix You uses footage filmed at their Horwich concerts. The track was performed twice on each night so enough footage could be captured.

The stadium also hosted the UK Open Darts Championship, boxing matches with local boxer Amir Khan and in 2011 Premiership rugby union, when Sale Sharks lost to London Irish. It will also host group matches and the quarter-final of the Rugby League World Cup in 2021.

The venue's Premier Suite is home to the UK's leading amateur mixed martial arts event, Full Contact Contender.

In August 2019, the stadium hosted a campaign rally by Labour Party leader Jeremy Corbyn.

In March and April 2021 the stadium held Crown Court cases due to the large amount that had built up as a result of the COVID-19 pandemic whilst the actual Courts were closed. In the same year it was a venue for COVID-19 vaccinations.

Snooker
The 2021 Champion of Champions (also known as the 2021 Cazoo Champion of Champions for the purposes of sponsorship) professional snooker tournament was hosted at the stadium between 15 and 21 November 2021

Rugby League
The stadium has also hosted seven rugby league matches.

Rugby League Test Matches

World Club Challenge

Challenge Cup
In 2018, the stadium hosted the first ever double-header semi-finals of the Challenge Cup, repeated in 2019.

Bolton Wanderers Free School
In 2014, the club established Bolton Wanderers Free School at the stadium. It was a sixth form centre offering sports and related courses for 16- to 19-year-olds, and utilised the facilities of the stadium for most of its teaching and learning. However, this closed in 2017 due to low pupil numbers which made it 'not financially viable'.

Attendances

Record attendances

Record attendance: 28,353 v Leicester City, 28 December 2003
(FA Premier League)

Lowest attendance for a competitive match: 1,540 v Everton U23s, 30 August 2016 Football League Trophy, Northern Group Stage, Game One

Lowest Premier League attendance: 17,014 v Derby County, 2 January 2008

Record UEFA Cup attendance: 26,163 v Atlético Madrid, 14 February 2008 Last 32 1st leg

Record FA Cup attendance: 23,523 v Arsenal, 12 March 2005 quarter finals

Record League Cup Attendance: 18,037 v Tottenham Hotspur, 27 October 2004, Third round

Average attendances

Nat Lofthouse statue

Bolton Wanderers unveiled a bronze statue of their most famous player, Nat Lofthouse (1925–2011), prior to a game against Queens Park Rangers on 24 August 2013. The statue, which cost £100,000 due to the generosity of public donations and sponsors, is situated near to the south-west corner of the stadium and was officially revealed by club owner Eddie Davies in a special ceremony.

Club chaplain Phil Mason, chairman Phil Gartside and the son of Nat Lofthouse – Jeff Lofthouse, also took part in the ceremony as did sculptor Sean Hedges-Quinn. Hedges-Quinn had taken 18 months overall to complete the project having worked successfully on the statues such as that of Bob Stokoe at The Stadium of Light, Ted Bates at St Mary's Stadium and Sir Bobby Robson and Alf Ramsey at Portman Road.

Transport
The stadium's West Stand lies about 200 metres from Horwich Parkway railway station. The station lies between Lostock and Blackrod on the Manchester to Preston Line. Football specials operate to and from this station on matchdays. Bus services are laid on by the club from across the borough when the Wanderers are at home.

On non-matchdays Horwich Parkway is served by three services an hour in each direction, operated by Northern or TransPennine Express. Numerous routes serve bus stops near or at the ground, operated by Arriva North West, Vision Bus and Diamond Bus North West.

References

External links

  on Bolton Wanderers FC
 Reebok Stadium website
 Bolton Wanderers Free School

Sports venues completed in 1997
Bolton Wanderers F.C.
Buildings and structures in the Metropolitan Borough of Bolton
Football venues in England
Premier League venues
Sport in the Metropolitan Borough of Bolton
Rugby League World Cup stadiums
Sports venues in Greater Manchester
Darts venues
Music venues in Greater Manchester
Reebok
English Football League venues
Bradshaw, Gass & Hope buildings
1997 establishments in England